Joe Mullins (born 18 October 1937) is a Canadian athlete. He competed at the 800 metres and the 1500 metres at the 1960 Summer Olympics.

References

1937 births
Living people
Athletes (track and field) at the 1960 Summer Olympics
Canadian male sprinters
Canadian male middle-distance runners
Olympic track and field athletes of Canada
Athletes (track and field) at the 1958 British Empire and Commonwealth Games
Commonwealth Games competitors for Canada
Place of birth missing (living people)